
The following lists events that happened during 1839 in South Africa.

Events
 January - Henry Jervis is elected the Military Administrator of Port Natal
 15 February to May - Johannes Stephanus Maritz is voted Natalia Republic's chairperson of the Raad
 20 October - Johannes Stephanus Maritz is voted Natalia Republic's chairperson of the Raad for the second time
 December - The Cape Colony relinquishes Port Natal and it is incorporated into the Natalia Republic.

Births
 7 December - Redvers Henry Buller in at Crediton, Devonshire
 John Robinson, the first Prime minister of Natal (1893 - 1897) is born

Deaths
 Barend Barends, Kaptyn of Griqualand West, dies
 Du Pré Alexander, Earl of Caledon and Governor of the Cape Colony, dies
 Sir John Francis Cradock, Governor of the Cape, dies

References
See Years in South Africa for list of References

 
South Africa
Years in South Africa